The World Hindi Conference, in Hindi: Vishva Hindi Sammelan, is a world conference on Hindi language. It consists of several Hindi scholars, writers and laureates from different parts of the world who contribute to the language. World Hindi Day is celebrated each year on 10 January with events organized by the National Council of Indian Culture, Hindi Nidhi Foundation, Indian High Commission, Mahatma Gandhi Institute for Cultural Co-operation, and the Sanatan Dharma Maha Sabha.

List of conferences

History

The first World Hindi Conference was inaugurated on 10 January 1975 by the then Prime Minister of India Indira Gandhi. It was held from 10 to 12 January 1975 in Nagpur. Seewoosagur Ramgoolam, then Prime Minister of Mauritius attended conference as the chief guest. 122 delegates from 30 countries participated in the conference. Ninth World Hindi Conference was held from 22 to 24 September 2012 in Johannesburg, South Africa. The conference was inaugurated by Indian Minister of State for External Affairs Preneet Kaur and South African Finance Minister Pravin Gordhan.

The tenth World Hindi Conference is being organized from 10–12 September 2015 in the city of Bhopal by the Ministry of External Affairs, government of India along with the partnership of the government of Madhya Pradesh. The decision to organize the tenth conference in India was taken at the ninth conference held in Johannesburg in September 2012. The eleventh conference was hosted by Mauritius. The twelfth conference will be hosted by Fiji.

See also
 World Hindi Secretariat
 Hindi divas
 World Tamil Conference
 World Telugu Conference

References 

10th World Hindi Conference official Website ,दसवें विश्व हिंदी सम्मेलन की आधिकारिक वेबसाइट

Hindi languages
Language advocacy organizations
1975 in India